The 2002 North Dakota State Bison football team was an American football team that represented North Dakota State University during the 2002 NCAA Division II football season as a member of the North Central Conference. In their sixth year under head coach Bob Babich, the team compiled a 2–8 record.

Schedule

References

North Dakota State
North Dakota State Bison football seasons
North Dakota State Bison football